Trioctylphosphine oxide (TOPO) is an organophosphorus compound with the formula OP(C8H17)3. Frequently referred to as TOPO, this compound is used as an extraction or stabilizing agent. It is an air-stable white solid at room temperature.

Preparation and use
TOPO is usually prepared by oxidation of trioctylphosphine, which in turn is produced by alkylation of phosphorus trichloride.

The main use of TOPO is in solvent extraction of metals, especially uranium.  The high lipophilicity and high polarity are properties key to this application.  Its high polarity, which results from the dipolar phosphorus-oxygen bond, allows this compound to bind to metal ions.  The octyl groups confer solubility in low polarity solvents such as kerosene.

In the research laboratory, both trioctylphosphine and TOPO are frequently useful as a capping ligand for the production of quantum dots such as those consisting of CdSe. In these cases, TOPO serves as solvent for the synthesis and solubilizes the growing nanoparticles. TOPO-coated quantum dots are typically soluble in chloroform, toluene, and (to a lesser extent) hexane.

References

Organophosphine oxides